Nađ is a Serbian-language phonetic transcription of the Hungarian surname Nagy. Notable people with this surname include:

 Albert Nađ (born 1974), footballer
 Antonija Nađ (born 1986), sprint canoer
 Kosta Nađ (1911–1986), Yugoslav Army general
Stevan Nađ (1903-1982), Yugoslav wrestler

Serbian surnames
Hungarian-language surnames